Penitentiary Cove is a valley in the U.S. state of Georgia.

Penitentiary Cove was so named on account of its rugged terrain, figuratively confining a visitor like a penitentiary.

References

Landforms of Lumpkin County, Georgia
Valleys of Georgia (U.S. state)